Charles Frederick South (1850 – August 1916) was a cathedral organist, who served at Salisbury Cathedral.  A couple of Anglican chants by him are still in use.

Background

Charles Frederick South was born on 6 February 1850 in London.

He received the support of John Stainer who wrote:

I hear on all sides of the beauty of your musical services, Mr. South seems not only to have raised them to a high standard but to have maintained them at this level. If I am correctly informed about this, do you not think it would be a nice compliment to him if you were to obtain for him the degree of Mus.Doc. from the Archbishop?

He died at his home in Salisbury in August 1916 at age 66.

Career

Organist of:
Aske's Hospital, Hoxton 1866–1868
St Augustine's, Watling Street 1868–1883
Salisbury Cathedral 1883–1916

References

English classical organists
British male organists
Cathedral organists
1850 births
1916 deaths
19th-century English musicians
19th-century British male musicians
19th-century organists
20th-century English musicians
20th-century British male musicians
20th-century organists
19th-century classical musicians
Male classical organists